Banca Commerciale Italiana (BCI) established Banca Commerciale Italiana Trust Co. of New York (BCITNY) in 1924 and closed it in 1939.

In 1917 Lodovico Toeplitz, chief of the Foreign Department of BCI visited New York. In January 1918 BCI established a branch in New York on Broadway. The bank's aim was to finance imports to the US from Italy, to fund acceptance credits, and to gather the deposits of Italian migrants to the US. In 1921 the bank transferred its branch to a building on Williams Street that BCI had bought. In 1924, following changes in US regulations, BCI decided to open a US subsidiary, Banca Commerciale Italiana Trust Co. of New York, in order to be able to continue to gather deposits. Four years later, in March to June 1928, Giuseppe Toeplitz came to New York to oversee the opening of Bancomit Corp., which BCI established better to operate in US real estate markets. In time, BCIT came to have offices on 6th Avenue and Mulberry Street, and in Harlem, South Brooklyn, and Long Island City.

In 1929 BCI established two more subsidiaries, Banca Commerciale Italiana Trust Co. of Boston (est. 15 January 1929), and Banca Commerciale Italiana Trust Co. of Philadelphia.

In 1933, Adolfo Rossi of BCI traveled to New York to implement a reorganization of BCI's operations in North America. In late 1934 the bank received US$15,000 in gold from South American mines. The producers apparently found it profitable to ship the gold to New York to sell it to the US Government.

In 1937 BCI liquidated the Boston operation. In 1938 it closed the Philadelphia operation after selling the business to Liberty Title & Trust Co.

In February 1939, BCI liquidated BCITNY and transferred its assets to Manufacturers Trust Co. of New York. Two years later, after the US declared war on Italy on 11 December 1941, the United States Federal Reserve sequestrated and liquidated the assets of BCI's branch in the US. BCI would not return to New York until 6 March 1969 when it opened a branch there.

Citations and References
Citations

References
Banca Commercial Italiana (1997) Archivo Storico: Collana Inventari. (Milan).
State of New York Banking Department 

Defunct banks of the United States
Banks established in 1924
Banks disestablished in 1939
1924 establishments in New York (state)
1939 disestablishments in New York (state)
American companies disestablished in 1939
American companies established in 1924
Banks based in New York (state)
American subsidiaries of foreign companies